Eupithecia staurophragma is a moth of the family Geometridae. It was first described by Edward Meyrick in 1899. It is endemic to the Hawaiian islands of Maui and Hawaii.

References

External links

staurophragma
Endemic moths of Hawaii
Moths described in 1899